Hervé Paillet (born 1968) is a French actor and painter born with atrophied legs. He is the fifth child of his family. His legs were amputated when he was three years old, and he uses a wheelchair. Eventually he learned to run with his arms and became a weightlifter. As a teenager he won a silver medal in weightlifting at the 1984 Summer Paralympics. He participated in two more Paralympic Games in 1992 and 1996 as a powerlifter. In both 1994 and 1995 he won a French weightlifting championship.

Paillet is married and he has two daughters.

References

External links 
 

1968 births
French male actors
French amputees
20th-century French painters
20th-century French male artists
French male painters
21st-century French painters
21st-century French male artists
Living people
Paralympic weightlifters of France
Weightlifters at the 1984 Summer Paralympics
Paralympic powerlifters of France
Powerlifters at the 1992 Summer Paralympics
Powerlifters at the 1996 Summer Paralympics
Paralympic silver medalists for France
Medalists at the 1984 Summer Paralympics
Paralympic medalists in weightlifting